Furnace is an unincorporated community in Richland Township, Greene County, Indiana.

History
Furnace was named for the presence of an iron furnace.

References

Unincorporated communities in Greene County, Indiana
Unincorporated communities in Indiana
Bloomington metropolitan area, Indiana